The Bright Day is a 2013 Iranian social drama film directed by Hossein Shahabi.

It is his debut feature film which was very well received by Iranian film critics and audiences of the 31st Fajr Film Festival of Tehran in February 2013. The film also won the Special Jury Prize of 28th Mar del Plata International Film Festival in Argentina and it was shown on the 24th Annual Festival of Films from Iran in Chicago.also win Silver Pheasant Award and a cash prize for The Best Debut Director of the 19th International Film Festival of Kerala, India

Production
Producer: Hossein Shahabi
Production manager: bahareh ansari
Procurement Manager:Mohammad karhemmat
produced in Baran Film House Iran 2014

Starring 
Pantea Bahram
Ronak Yoonesi
Soodabeh Beyzaee
Mehran Ahmadi
Amir Karbalaeezadeh
Alireza Ostadi
Bahram Behbahani
Mohammadreza Alimardani
Vahid Aghapoor
Amir Delavari
Parya Ebrahimi

Crew 
Director Of Photography:Mohammadreza Sokoot
Composer: Hossein Shahabi
Sound recorder: Babak Ardalan
Edit:Shima Monfared - Hossein Eyvazi
Costume Designer:Hossein Shahabi
Director of Consulting: Bahareh Ansari
Assistsnts Director: Mahdi Tavakkoli - Siavash Shahabi
Pianist: Babk Parsian

Awards and Screenings
 won Diploma award the best screenplay of the 31st Fajr International Film Festival. Iran (2013)
 won Diploma award the best Actress of the 31st Fajr International Film Festival. Iran (2013)
 Candidate a Crystal Simorgh award at 31st Fajr International Film Festival for best first film (2013)
 Candidate a Crystal simorgh award for Best Actor at 31st Fajr International Film Festival  (2013)
 Candidate a Crystal simorgh award for Best Sound recorder at 31st Fajr International Film Festival (2013)
 Candidate a Crystal simorgh award for Best Graphic Design at 31st Fajr International Film Festival (2013)
 win Special Mention of the Jury-at 28th international film festival mar del plata  (2014) 
 Companies at 28th Film Festival in Boston America (2014)
 Companies at 21 Film Festival in Houston America (2014)
 Companies at 18 Film Festival in Washington DC America (2014)
 Companies at the Iranian films festival in America Rice University (2014)
 Companies  at the Iranian films festival in  America The Los Angeles Museum of Art (2014)
  Companies  at the Iranian films festival in  America UCLA University   for the movie "the bright day" (2014) 
  Companies  at the 3rd Persian International Film Festival Sydney, Australia     for the movie "the bright day" (2014)
 Silver Pheasant Award and a cash prize for best director's first film of the 19th International Film Festival of Kerala, India (2014) 
 Companies at the 11th international film festival of zurich (2015)

References

External links 
The Bright Day at Iranian New Wave imdb
A Review for the bright day
The Bright Day review
Hossein Shahabi's first feature film criticism/By: Aravind Sekhar
Catalog of festival
letterboxd
iran project
the bright day at IMDb

Iranian independent films
Iranian drama films
Films set in Tehran
Films shot in Iran
Films directed by Hossein Shahabi